Federico Malvestiti (born 12 June 2000) is an Italian racing driver who most recently competed in the FIA F3 Championship for Jenzer Motorsport. He is a race winner in the Italian F4 Championship.

Career

Karting

Malvestiti was born in Monza, and began karting in 2010 in events such as Easykart International Grand Final and Trofeo Nazionale Easykart.

Italian F4
Malvestiti's first outing in single seaters was in Italian F4 in 2015 with Antonelli Motorsport where he competed in two rounds, finishing no higher than 12th. In 2016 Malvestiti competed full time with Antonelli Motorsport where he scored points twice and finished 25th in the standings. Malvestiti's 2nd season in 2017 saw him drive for Jenzer Motorsport. Malvestiti scored points six times and finished 10th in the standings. His 3rd and last season in Italian F4 was his best as he would finish fifth in the standings with four podiums, two pole positions, and a win at Imola.

ADAC Formula 4

Malvestiti took part as a guest driver in the 2018 ADAC Formula 4 Championship for Jenzer Motorsport at the second round at the Hockenheimring. Malvestiti finished 7th and 10th but as he was a guest driver, he did not score points.

Formula Renault Eurocup

In 2019, Malvestiti competed for Bhaitech in the Formula Renault Eurocup. His only podium came at Circuit de Spa-Francorchamps where he secured 3rd place, four more points finishes took him to 14th in the table with 36 points.

FIA Formula 3 Championship

2019 

Artem Petrov's lack of funding at the end of the first race in 2019 meant that Jenzer Motorsport replaced him with Giorgio Carrara. However, due to visa complications, Malvestiti replaced Carrara for the forth round at Silverstone. The Italian retired in the Feature race due to a battery failure and finished 23rd in the sprint race.

2020 
On 10 February 2020, Malvestiti announced he would be competing the full season with Jenzer, partnering Calan Williams and Matteo Nannini. He would experience a disappointing season, finishing 30th in the standings, having failed to score any points.

2022 
In 2022, Malvestiti returned to Jenzer partnering Ido Cohen and William Alatalo. Malvestiti completed the season 29th in the standings, having scored no points and having a best finish of 13th.

Karting record

Karting career summary

Racing record

Career summary

Complete Italian F4 Championship results
(key) (Races in bold indicate pole position) (Races in italics indicate fastest lap)

Complete Formula Renault Eurocup results
(key) (Races in bold indicate pole position) (Races in italics indicate fastest lap)

Complete FIA Formula 3 Championship results
(key) (Races in bold indicate pole position; races in italics indicate points for the fastest lap of top ten finishers)

References

External links
 

2000 births
Living people
Italian racing drivers
ADAC Formula 4 drivers
Italian F4 Championship drivers
FIA Formula 3 Championship drivers
Formula Renault Eurocup drivers
Jenzer Motorsport drivers
Bhaitech drivers
Chinese F4 Championship drivers